Calvert is an unincorporated community and census-designated place (CDP) in Mobile and Washington counties, Alabama, United States. It is located in the extreme northeast corner of Mobile County and southeast corner of Washington County near the Tombigbee River, along U.S. Route 43. As of the 2020 census, the population of Calvert was 255.

German technology conglomerate ThyssenKrupp broke ground on a US$4.65 billion stainless and carbon steel processing facility in Calvert in 2007. The facility became operational in July 2010. ThyssenKrupp's stainless steel division, Inoxum, including the stainless portion of the Calvert plant, was sold to Finnish stainless steel company Outokumpu in 2012. The remaining portion of the ThyssenKrupp plant, with a production capacity of 5.3 million metric tons that includes a hot strip mill, cold roll mill and four coating lines, was purchased by a 50/50 joint partnership of ArcelorMittal and Nippon Steel in February 2014 for $1.5 billion and renamed AM/NS Calvert. It is the region's 2nd largest industrial employer.

Demographics

Note: the US Census treats Hispanic/Latino as an ethnic category. This table excludes Latinos from the racial categories and assigns them to a separate category. Hispanics/Latinos can be of any race.

2020 census

Education
Residents of the Mobile County section are zoned to Mobile County Public School System campuses. Residents of that section are zoned to Citronelle High School. The Mobile County section of the community was formerly in the attendance boundary of the Belsaw/MT. Vernon K-8 school in Mount Vernon, which closed in 2016.

Residents of the Washington County section are served by Washington County School District.

References

Census-designated places in Alabama
Unincorporated communities in Alabama
Census-designated places in Mobile County, Alabama